Sevinçli is a village in the Aksaray District, Aksaray Province, Turkey. Its population is 1,618 (2021). Before the 2013 reorganisation, it was a town (belde).

References

Villages in Aksaray District